Egidijus Mockevičius (born September 1, 1992) is a Lithuanian professional basketball player who last played for Fos Provence Basket of the LNB Pro A. He played college basketball for the University of Evansville.

Early life
Before joining Evansville, Mockevičius played for Akademija Vilnius in Lithuania. There he played for two seasons, averaging 14.3 points and 7.6 rebounds while shooting a 71% from the floor in his last season.

College career
In his third year, Mockevičius averaged 12.5 points and 9.9 rebounds, accumulating a total of 20 double-doubles. He finished the season with a powerful 27 point and 12 rebound performance On November 28, 2015, Mockevičius grabbed a career-high 21 rebounds. On January 2, 2016, he repeated this achievement. Following his fourth and final season, he was named defensive MVP of the conference and was included into the first-team All-MVC for a second straight season. In his fourth NCAA season, he averaged 15.7 points, 14 rebounds and 2.8 blocks per game.

Professional career
After going undrafted in the 2016 NBA draft, Mockevičius joined the Brooklyn Nets for the 2016 NBA Summer League. On August 5, 2016, he signed with the Nets, but was later waived on October 18 after appearing in one preseason game. On November 1, he was acquired by the Long Island Nets of the NBA Development League as an affiliate player of the Nets. On November 11, he made his professional debut in a 123–94 loss to the Windy City Bulls, recording eight points, three rebounds, one assist, one steal and three blocks in 22 minutes off the bench.

On September 30, 2017, Mockevičius signed a three-year deal with Lietuvos rytas Vilnius, but was not able to play from the start of the season due to injury. On July 5, 2018, Mockevičius' contract was terminated by the team.

On July 25, 2018, Mockevičius signed a one-year contract with VL Pesaro of the Italian Lega Basket Serie A (LBA). He would go on to lead the league in rebounds per game during the 2018–19 season. On August 7, 2019, Mockevičius signed a two-year deal with Spanish club Montakit Fuenlabrada.

On June 25, 2020, he has signed with Le Mans Sarthe of the French LNB Pro A.

On March 1, 2022, he has signed with Fos Provence Basket of the LNB Pro A.

National team career
Mockevičius won four gold medals with Lithuania national teams: European Youth Summer Olympic Festival (U-15) in 2007, Europe U-18 in 2010, World U-19 in 2011 and Europe U-20 in 2012.

References

External links
 Evansville Purple Aces bio
 ESPN.com profile
 ACB.com profile

1992 births
Living people
Baloncesto Fuenlabrada players
BC Rytas players
Centers (basketball)
Evansville Purple Aces men's basketball players
Fos Provence Basket players
Lega Basket Serie A players
Le Mans Sarthe Basket players
Liga ACB players
Lithuanian expatriate basketball people in the United States
Lithuanian expatriate sportspeople in Italy
Lithuanian men's basketball players
Long Island Nets players
People from Kuršėnai
Victoria Libertas Pallacanestro players